Phyllocoma is a genus of sea snails, marine gastropod mollusks in the family Muricidae, the murex snails or rock snails.

Species
Species within the genus Phyllocoma include
 Phyllocoma convoluta (Broderip, 1833)
 Phyllocoma platyca Houart, 2001
 Phyllocoma scalariformis (Broderip, 1833)
 Phyllocoma speciosa (Angas, 1871)
.Synonyms:
 Phyllocoma neglecta Habe & Kosuge, 1971: synonym of Dermomurex neglectus (Habe & Kosuge, 1971) (original combination)
 Phyllocoma sculptilis (Reeve, 1846): synonym of Phrygiomurex sculptilis (Reeve, 1844)

References

External links
 Tapparone Canefri, C. (1881). Glanures dans la faune malacologique de l'Ile Maurice. Catalogue de la famille des Muricidés. 100 pp., 2 pls.
 Iredale, T. (1924). Results from Roy Bell's molluscan collections. Proceedings of the Linnean Society of New South Wales. 49(3): 179-278

Muricidae